The Perfect Gentleman (also known by the alternative title The Imperfect Lady) is a 1935 American comedy film directed by Tim Whelan and starring Frank Morgan, Cicely Courtneidge and Heather Angel. It was based on a play by Edward Childs Carpenter (which was based on a story by Cosmo Hamilton). The screenplay concerns the father of a British country vicar, who almost brings scandal on the family when he becomes entangled with an actress.

Cast
 Frank Morgan as Major Horatio Chatteris 
 Cicely Courtneidge as April Maye 
 Heather Angel as Evelyn Alden 
 Herbert Mundin as Frederick Hitch 
 Una O'Connor as Harriet Chatteris 
 Richard Waring as John Chatteris 
 Henry Stephenson as Bishop 
 Forrester Harvey as  Wally Baxton 
 Mary Forbes as Lady Clyffe-Pembrook 
 Doris Lloyd as Kate 
 Edward Cooper as Alf 
 Brenda Forbes as Penelope, the Maid 
 David Clyde as Morse
Charles Coleman as Theatre Doorman

Critical reception
Writing for The Spectator in 1936, Graham Greene gave the film a poor review, summarizing his review as "to be avoided at any cost". Noting that Cicely Courtneidge had come from a theatrical background and that her acting skills were adequate for the stage, Greene described her aspect in this film as "fling[ing] her facial contortions to the back of the gallery", and expressed sorrow that so many of the stage's most capable comedians were today "going the Pagliacci way". Greene took particular dislike of the scene where Courtneidge played the part of a young soldier.

References

External links

1935 films
American comedy films
Films directed by Tim Whelan
Metro-Goldwyn-Mayer films
Films set in England
1935 comedy films
Films produced by Harry Rapf
American black-and-white films
Films set in London
1930s English-language films
1930s American films